Club Soda is a music venue in Montreal, Quebec, Canada.  Its address is 1225 Saint Laurent Boulevard in the Quartier des Spectacles in the borough of Ville-Marie.

History
Club Soda was established in 1982 by Joseph Martellino, Guy Gosselin, André Gagnon and Martin Després. The first act at Club Soda was Boule Noire on November 18, 1982, which was followed by Ding et Dong.

Club Soda was originally located on Park Avenue.  Montreal concert promoter Rubin Fogel became a part owner in 1985.  The original Club Soda closed in July 1999. It re-opened in its current location on Saint Laurent Boulevard on March 21, 2000, following extensive renovations. The building in which it is currently located was constructed in 1908 and was known as the Crystal Palace. During the 1940s it was a Cabaret.  The current owners of the club are Després, Fogel and Fogel's longtime concert promotion partner Michel Sabourin.

References

External links

Theatres in Montreal
Music venues in Montreal
Buildings and structures completed in 1908
Quartier des spectacles
1908 establishments in Quebec